Bebearia lucayensis, the plain forester, is a butterfly in the family Nymphalidae. It is found in Ivory Coast, Ghana, Nigeria, Cameroon, the Republic of the Congo and the Democratic Republic of the Congo. The habitat consists of forests.

The larvae feed on Hypselodelphys and Marantochloa species.

References

Butterflies described in 1996
lucayensis